Aviv Yechezkel (born 21 April 1994 in Metzer) is an Israeli former cyclist, who rode professionally for the  team between 2016 and 2018.

Major results
Source: 

2012
 1st  Time trial, National Junior Road Championships
2015
 2nd Time trial, National Road Championships
2016
 National Road Championships
1st  Time trial
2nd Road race
 1st  National Cyclo-cross Championships
2017
 3rd Road race, National Road Championships

References

External links

1994 births
Living people
Israeli male cyclists